The Sanchakou–Yarkant Expressway, commonly referred to as the S13 Sansha Expressway, is an expressway that connects the town of  in Maralbexi County with Yarkant County. The route is entirely in the Kashgar Prefecture in the Chinese autonomous region of Xinjiang. It opened on November 17, 2014, and parallels much of Xinjiang Provincial Highway 215. In some sources, the expressway is referred to as the Maralbexi–Yarkant Expressway, or Basha Expressway for short.

The expressway connects with the G3012 Turpan–Hotan Expressway at both ends, serving as a bypass of the city centre of Kashgar. It was built with the help of resources from the municipality of Shanghai.

References

Expressways in Xinjiang